Permanent Fatal Error (PFE) is a project by Olivier Manchion, Ulan Bator founder member, and long time Faust collaborator. PFE first album is entitled Law Speed and was released in 2004 by Wallace Records, Klangbad  -the label of Faust core member Hans-Joachim Irmler - and Ruminance. The musician defines this music as "deaf-blues". The project turns into solo (Santarcangelo festival, London Scala) or duo performances with Giulio Vetrone like the Pop Montreal festival in 2006, while Manchion joins again Ulan Bator and Faust in 2005 and 2006, touring also again with Damo Suzuki of Can (band) in France part of the "French Doctors" collective, and then disappears for years. In November 2014 Manchion announced the relaunch of the project and a new release entitled "Deaf sun / Deaf blues" on the Italian "microlabel" Secret furry hole.

About
Permanent Fatal Error's music can be described as folk, post-rock, alternative, experimental, free-rock, indie, post-punk but mostly deaf-blues. They produce soundtracks and play rock with acoustic guitars with electronic sounds.

Discography
Albums
 Law Speed (2004) Wallace, Ruminance, Klangbad
 Deaf sun / Deaf blues (2015) Secret furry hole

V/A
 Santarcangelo International festival of the Arts, vol.1 (2007) Santarcangelo dei Teatri
 Next Step (2005) Klangbad

Remix
 De Breath and its double, for (r) (2002) Mandarangan

References

External links
 
 Olivier Manchion official website

French post-rock groups
French indie rock groups
French art rock groups
Musical groups established in 2002
2002 establishments in France
Musical groups from Paris